Horse-chopping sword may refer to:
 Zhanmadao, a single-bladed anti-cavalry Chinese sword
 Zanbatō, an especially large, single-edged sword dating to the Heian period of historical Japan